Boyce Block is a historic commercial building located at Muncie, Delaware County, Indiana. It was built in 1880, and is a two-story, brick building.  The building features an elaborate parapet.  Since 1904, the building has housed a theater.

It was added to the National Register of Historic Places in 1984.

References

Commercial buildings on the National Register of Historic Places in Indiana
Commercial buildings completed in 1880
Buildings and structures in Muncie, Indiana
National Register of Historic Places in Muncie, Indiana
1880 establishments in Indiana